Pieres Peak is a mountain in the Mount Royal Range in Northern New South Wales.

It is located entirely within the Mount Royal National Park.

References

Mountains of New South Wales
Singleton Council
Hunter Region